Charles Speight may refer to:
 Charles Speight (businessman) (1865–1928), New Zealand brewer and businessman
 Charles Speight (rugby union) (1870–1935), New Zealand rugby union player and local politician